Welcome to the Jungle is a 2007 American found footage docufiction horror film directed by Jonathan Hensleigh and starring Sandy Gardiner, Callard Harris, Nickolas Richey and Veronica Sywak. A stylistic homage to the highly controversial cult horror film Cannibal Holocaust, the film follows a group of ambitious reporters who run afoul of a bloodthirsty native tribe.

Plot
The plot of Welcome to the Jungle concerns two young couples (Colby & Mandi, Mikey & Bijou) who go to Southwest New Guinea from Fiji in order to find Michael Rockefeller, the son of New York Governor Nelson Rockefeller who disappeared back in 1961, and sell an interview with him to the tabloids for $1,000,000. After a close encounter with armed criminals and psychopathic border guards, they receive evidence from a local community that suggests that Michael Rockefeller may still be alive.  The group finally makes it to the location where Rockefeller was last seen.  As they continue deep into the jungle, they find two Christian missionaries.  They also come across a middle-aged Australian man who warns the group not to disturb the tribes in the area or else they will be killed. However tensions rise between the two couples, which ultimately attracts the attention of a local blood-thirsty cannibalistic tribe.  They stalk Mikey and Bijou while they are on a makeshift boat in the river, and then attack them when they make their way to shore.

Meanwhile, the next morning Colby and Mandi realize that most of their essential belongings are missing, and they fear that Mikey and Bijou took their items and went on ahead to find and interview Rockefeller without them.  They then decide to go find their friends but end up finding blood and bits of their clothing on the shore where they were kidnapped.  Fearing for their welfare, Colby and Mandi continue deep into the jungle, and later that day find the body of Bijou.  Later that night, they find half-eaten bodies of the Christian missionaries whom they met earlier.  And eventually find Mikey whose legs and arms have been eaten off; they decide to kill him out of mercy and escape.  After escaping from the cannibals, the young couple come across a seemingly friendlier tribe who invites them to their village and provides them with food to eat.  Colby and Mandi then talk about what they are going to do with their lives after they escape, but their conversation is cut short when the tribe knock them unconscious, and kill them while their portable camera carries on filming. Seconds later, an older white man is seen walking away from the tribe.

Cast
Sandy Gardiner as  Mandi
Callard Harris as Colby
Nick Richey as Mikey
Veronica Sywak as Bijou
D. Kevin Epps as Fijian Warrior Shaman
John R. Leonetti as Helicopter Pilot
Clifton Morris as Fijian Warrior
Rich Morris as Christian Missionary
Jeran Pascascio as Fijian Warrior
Del Roy as Old Man
Darren Anthony Thomas as Fijian Warrior

Release
The film premiered at the London FrightFest Film Festival on April 19, 2007 before being released direct to DVD in most major territories.

References

External links

2007 films
2007 horror films
American horror films
American independent films
Found footage films
Films about cannibalism
Films produced by Gale Anne Hurd
Films directed by Jonathan Hensleigh
Films set in Indonesia
Films shot in Fiji
Films shot in California
Films shot in Los Angeles County, California
2000s English-language films
2000s American films